This is a list of entertainment news programs. An entertainment news program focuses on news involving the entertainment industry, including the world of film, television and music.

A
Access Hollywood
Ang Latest
Aquino & Abunda Tonight
Aux Weekly

B
Best Week Ever
BET Style
Big Morning Buzz Live
Boulevard of Broken Dreams
The Buzz

C
Confidential
Cristy Per Minute
A Current Affair

D
The Daily 10
Dish Nation
DVD Show

E
E! News
E! True Hollywood Story
Entertainment Desk
Entertainment Live
Entertainment Spotlight
Entertainment Tonight
Entertainment Tonight Canada
Entertainment Tonight UK 
Escandalo TV
ESPN Hollywood
Etalk
Extra

F
FashionTelevision
FAX

G
El Gordo y la Flaca
The Gossip Table

H
Hard Copy
Hollywood 411
H.O.T. TV
HypaSpace

I
Inside Edition
The Insider
El Intermedio
The Alex Jones Show"

JJuicy!MMTV e2MTV NewsMTV News (Canada)Mysteries and ScandalsNNational Enquirer TVThe NewMusicOOh So CosmoOK!TVOn the Red CarpetPPaparazziPlayRReel to RealSS-FilesScreen SceneSé lo que hicisteis...Showbiz CentralShowbiz Inside ReportShowbiz LingoShowbiz PoliceThe Showbiz Show with David SpadeShowbiz TonightSNN: Showbiz News NgayonSpace Top 10 CountdownStar! DailyStartalkStartvTTMZ on TVVVerissimoWWhat'z Up?World of PlayboyYYoung Hollywood''

Entertainment news